The Meerut Cavalry Brigade was a cavalry brigade of the British Indian Army formed in 1904 as a result of the Kitchener Reforms.  It was mobilized as 7th (Meerut) Cavalry Brigade at the outbreak of the First World War and departed for the Western Front where it served as part of the 2nd Indian Cavalry Division.

It was reorganized in June 1916 as 7th Indian Cavalry Brigade and took part in the Mesopotamian campaign.  It formed part of the occupation forces for Mesopotamia after the end of the war and was broken up late in 1920.

History
The Kitchener Reforms, carried out during Lord Kitchener's tenure as Commander-in-Chief, India (1902–09), completed the unification of the three former Presidency armies, the Punjab Frontier Force, the Hyderabad Contingent and other local forces into one Indian Army.  Kitchener identified the Indian Army's main task as the defence of the North-West Frontier against foreign aggression (particularly Russian expansion into Afghanistan) with internal security relegated to a secondary role.  The Army was organized into divisions and brigades that would act as field formations but also included internal security troops.

The Meerut Brigade was formed in November 1904 as a result of the Kitchener Reforms.  The brigade formed part of the 7th (Meerut) Division.  In 1908, it was redesignated as Meerut Cavalry Brigade.

7th (Meerut) Cavalry Brigade

In August 1914, the brigade was mobilized as the 7th (Meerut) Cavalry Brigade.  In company with the newly formed 5th (Mhow) Cavalry Brigade, it departed Bombay on 19 November 1914 and landed at Marseilles on 14–16 December.  It joined the 2nd Indian Cavalry Division which was formally constituted on 14 December.  The division concentrated around Orléans on 20–24 December and moved up to the Front on 1–4 January 1915.  While in France, the brigade was known by its geographical rather than numerical designation so as to avoid confusion with the British 7th Cavalry Brigade also serving on the Western Front at the same time.

The brigade did not take part in any significant actions while on the Western Front.  Instead, it was held in reserve in case of a breakthrough, although it did send parties to the trenches on a number of occasions. They would hold the line, or act as Pioneers; such parties were designated as the Meerut Battalion.

In June 1916, the brigade was extensively reorganized and was sent to Mesopotamia:
 3rd Skinner's Horse went to 2nd (Rawalpindi) Division
 18th King George's Own Tiwana Lancers transferred to 3rd (Ambala) Cavalry Brigade and was replaced by 30th Lancers (Gordon's Horse) which in turn joined the 1st (Peshawar) Division in August 1916.
 13th Duke of Connaught's Lancers (Watson's Horse) joined from the 1st (Peshawar) Division
 14th Murray's Jat Lancers joined from the 1st (Peshawar) Division

7th Indian Cavalry Brigade

The brigade arrived in Mesopotamia in August 1916 where it served as an independent brigade, as part of the Cavalry Division from 8 December 1916 to 8 April 1918, and as an independent brigade to the end of the war.

With the division, it took part in the Second Battle of Kut including the Advance to the Hai and Capture of the Khudaira Bend (14 December 1916 – 19 January 1917), the Capture of the Hai Salient (25 January–5 February 1917), and the Capture of the Dahra Bend (9–16 February).

It then took part in the Pursuit to Baghdad and a number of actions later in 1917.  In 1918 it took part in the Affair of Kulawand (27 April), the action of Tuz Khurmatli (29 April), the action at Fat-ha Gorge on the Little Zab (23–26 October 1918), and the Battle of Sharqat (28–30 October 1918) under the command of I Corps.

After the Armistice of Mudros, the brigade was selected to form part of the occupation forces for Mesopotamia.  The brigade was finally broken up in late 1920.

Orders of battle

Commanders
The Meerut Brigade / Meerut Cavalry Brigade / 7th (Meerut) Cavalry Brigade / 7th Indian Cavalry Brigade had the following commanders:

See also

 4th (Meerut) Cavalry Brigade
 Indian Cavalry Corps order of battle First World War
 Indian Expeditionary Force A

Notes

References

Bibliography

External links
 
 
 

C07
Cavalry brigades of the British Indian Army
Military units and formations established in 1904
Military units and formations disestablished in 1920